Taraxacum japonicum is a species of dandelion that grows in Japan.

Images

References

japonicum
Plants described in 1924
Flora of Japan